This page details the 1997 UNCAF Nations Cup, played in Guatemala.

Squads
For a complete list of all participating squads see UNCAF Nations Cup 1997 squads

Preliminary round

Venue

First round

Group A

Group B

Final round

Champions

 Costa Rica, Guatemala and El Salvador qualified automatically for 1998 CONCACAF Gold Cup.

All-star team
  Erick Lonnis
  Harold Wallace
  Mauricio Wright
  Wilfredo Iraheta
  Martín Machón
  Juan Manuel Funes
  Luis Diego Arnáez
  Amado Guevara
  Juan Carlos Plata
  Rolando Fonseca
  Wilmer Velásquez

References
RSSSF archives

 
1997 in Central American football
1997
1997
1996–97 in Salvadoran football
1996–97 in Costa Rican football
1996–97 in Honduran football
1996–97 in Guatemalan football